Old Soar Manor is an English Heritage property, owned and maintained by the National Trust. Located near Plaxtol, Kent, England, it is a small 13th century stone manor house. It is listed Grade I on the National Heritage List for England.

Built in 1290, the manor originally belonged to the Culpepper family. The centre of the house was originally the great hall but this no longer exists, as it was demolished in 1780 and replaced with the red-brick farmhouse on the site. The farmhouse is Grade II listed.  Visitors today can see the solar, latrine and chapel which remain.

References

External links 

photos of Old Soar Manor and surrounding area on geograph.org.uk

Buildings and structures completed in 1290
English Heritage sites in Kent
Country houses in Kent
Grade I listed houses in Kent
Tourist attractions in Kent
National Trust properties in Kent
Historic house museums in Kent